Cynthia Louise "Cindy" Ryder (born August 12, 1966) is an American Olympic athlete who won the gold medal in women's single sculls rowing event at the 1991 Pan American Games and participated in the 1992 Olympics in Barcelona.

External links

American female rowers
Olympic rowers of the United States
Rowers at the 1992 Summer Olympics
1966 births
Living people
Place of birth missing (living people)
Pan American Games gold medalists for the United States
Pan American Games medalists in rowing
Rowers at the 1991 Pan American Games
Medalists at the 1991 Pan American Games
21st-century American women